William Shakespeare's Macbeth has been screened numerous times, featuring many of the biggest names from stage, film, and television.

Performances 
Macbeth (United States, 1908, silent)
J. Stuart Blackton, director 
William V. Ranous as Macbeth
Louise Carver as Lady Macbeth
Macbeth (United States, 1916, silent, IMDB)
John Emerson, director
Herbert Beerbohm Tree as Macbeth
Constance Collier as Lady Macbeth
Macbeth (United States, 1948)
Orson Welles, director and as Macbeth
Jeanette Nolan as Lady Macbeth
Hallmark Hall of Fame Macbeth (TV, United States, 1954, IMDB)
Maurice Evans as Macbeth
Judith Anderson as Lady Macbeth    
Hallmark Hall of Fame Macbeth (1960, IMDB) – Emmy Award–winning remake, featuring an all-British supporting cast, and filmed on location in England and Scotland.
Maurice Evans as Macbeth
Judith Anderson as Lady Macbeth
Play of the Month: Macbeth (United Kingdom, TV, 1970; United States, TV, 1975)
John Gorrie, director
Eric Porter as Macbeth
Janet Suzman as Lady Macbeth
Macbeth (United States and United Kingdom, 1971)
Roman Polanski, director
Jon Finch as Macbeth
Francesca Annis as Lady Macbeth
Macbeth (TV, United Kingdom, 1979) – film of the Royal Shakespeare Company's Other Place production.
Philip Casson, director
Trevor Nunn, writer
Ian McKellen as Macbeth
Judi Dench as Lady Macbeth
Macbeth (United Kingdom, 1981)
Arthur Allan Seidelman, director
Jeremy Brett as Macbeth
Piper Laurie as Lady Macbeth
Macbeth (TV, Hungary, 1982)
Béla Tarr, director
György Cserhalmi as Macbeth
Erzsébet Kútvölgyi as Lady Macbeth
BBC Television Shakespeare Macbeth (TV, United Kingdom, 1983) – released in the United States as part of the Complete Dramatic Works of William Shakespeare series.
Jack Gold, director
Nicol Williamson as Macbeth
Jane Lapotaire as Lady Macbeth
Shakespeare: The Animated Tales Macbeth (TV, Russia and United Kingdom, 1992)
Nicolai Serebryakov, director
Brian Cox as the voice of Macbeth
Zoë Wanamaker as the voice of Lady Macbeth
Macbeth (United Kingdom, 1997)
Jeremy Freeston and Brian Blessed, directors
Jason Connery as Macbeth
Helen Baxendale as Lady Macbeth
Macbeth (TV, United Kingdom, 1998)
Michael Bogdanov, director
Sean Pertwee as Macbeth
Greta Scacchi as Lady Macbeth
Macbeth (Video, United Kingdom, 2001) – film of the Royal Shakespeare Company's Swan production.
Gregory Doran, director
Antony Sher as Macbeth
Harriet Walter as Lady Macbeth
Richard Armitage as Angus
Macbeth (TV, United Kingdom, 2010) – television adaptation of Royal Shakespeare Company's stage production.
Rupert Goold, director
Patrick Stewart as Macbeth
Kate Fleetwood as Lady Macbeth
Macbeth (United Kingdom, 2013) -  Shakespeare's Globe - The Globe on Screen's stage production
Eve Best, director
Joseph Milson, Macbeth
Billy Boyd, Banquo
Samantha Spiro, Lady Macbeth
Bette Bourne, Porter
Macbeth (United Kingdom, 2015)
Justin Kurzel, director
Michael Fassbender as Macbeth
Marion Cotillard as Lady Macbeth
Macbeth (United Kingdom, 2018)
Kit Monkman, director
Mark Rowley as Macbeth
Akiya Henry as Lady Macbeth
Macbeth (RU, 2020)
Sergei Tsimbalenko, producer/director
Sergei Tsimbalenko as Macbeth
The Tragedy of Macbeth (United States, 2021)
Joel Coen, writer/producer/director
Denzel Washington as Macbeth
Frances McDormand as Lady Macbeth

Unfinished
Macbeth (United Kingdom, 1956–59)
 Laurence Olivier, director and as Macbeth
 Vivien Leigh as Lady Macbeth

Adaptations 

Joe MacBeth (United Kingdom, 1955) is a film noir resetting of the story as a gang war in Chicago
Ken Hughes, director
Paul Douglas as Joe MacBeth
Ruth Roman as Lily Macbeth
Throne of Blood (a.k.a. Cobweb Castle or Kumonosu-jo) (Japan, 1957) is an adaptation of the Macbeth story to a Japanese setting.
Akira Kurosawa, director
Toshirō Mifune as Washizu Taketoki
Isuzu Yamada as Washizu Asaji 
Teenage Gang Debs (United States, 1966), setting the theme around a teenage girl who joins a street gang.
Sande N. Johnsen, director
Diane Conti as Terry (the Lady Macbeth character)
The first series of The Black Adder (TV, United Kingdom, 1983), written by Richard Curtis and Rowan Atkinson, is a parody of Shakespeare's plays, particularly Macbeth, Richard III and Henry V.
Men of Respect (United States, 1991) is a retelling of the Macbeth story as a Mafia power struggle in New York City, in modern English, but closely tracking the original plot. 
William Reilly, director
John Turturro as Mike Battaglia
Katherine Borowitz as Ruthie Battaglia
Scotland, PA (United States, 2001) is set in and around a fast food restaurant in the 1970s.
William Morrissette, writer/director
Maura Tierney as Pat McBeth
James LeGros as Joe "Mac" McBeth
Christopher Walken as Lieutenant McDuff
Kevin Corrigan as Anthony "Banko" Banconi
Andy Dick, Timothy "Speed" Levitch, and Amy Smart as the three Bohemians
Sangrador (Venezuela, 2003) is an adaptation set in the 1900s Andean Venezuelan mountains
Leonardo Henríquez, director
Daniel Alvarado, as Max (the Macbeth character)
Karina Gómez, as Mileidi (the Lady Macbeth character)
Maqbool (India, 2004) is a Macbeth adaptation set in the Mumbai underworld.
Vishal Bhardwaj, director
Irfan Khan as Mian Maqbool (the Macbeth character)
Tabu as Nimmi (the Lady Macbeth character)
ShakespeaRe-Told Macbeth (United Kingdom, TV, 2005) is a modern adaptation by Peter Moffat, set in a Glasgow restaurant.
James McAvoy as Joe Macbeth
Keeley Hawes as Ella (the Lady Macbeth character)
Richard Armitage as Peter Macduff
Macbeth (Australia, 2006) – film set against the backdrop of a violent gang war in Melbourne, Australia.
Geoffrey Wright, director
Sam Worthington as Macbeth
Victoria Hill as Lady Macbeth
Veeram (India, 2016) is a Malayalam language adaptation set in 13th century India.
Joji (India, 2021) is a Malayalam language crime drama based on Macbeth.
Mandaar (India, 2021) is an Indian Bengali language crime thriller adaptation set in a fishing village in West Bengal, released as a web series and is available on Hoichoi.

Theatrical performances within films 

Another way in which filmmakers use Shakespearean texts is to feature characters who are actors performing those texts, within a wider non-Shakespearean story. In Opera, the 1987 Italian giallo horror film written and directed by Dario Argento and starring Cristina Marsillach, Urbano Barberini, and Ian Charleson; young opera singer Betty (Marsillach) is reluctantly thrust into the lead role in Verdi's Macbeth. During her first performance, a murder takes place in one of the opera boxes. Mysterious murders continue throughout the film as Betty is stalked and those around her meet their unfortunate end. During the final performance of the opera, the killer is revealed, and Betty must confront her past in a terrifying climax.

See also 

 Shakespeare on screen
 The Scottish Play

References

Films based on Macbeth